Syed Najmuddin Ghawsud Dahar Qalandar (Urdu:) well known as Qutub ul Aqtaab (1209-1324 CE, probably born at Delhi, India) was a Qalandar and Sunni Muslim scholar, Sufi saint of the Chishti Order, and one of the most famous Sufis on the Indian subcontinent who lived and taught in India. He traced his lineage to Muhammad through Imam Hussain. Hazrat Nizamuddin gaznavi made him his Mureed, he later asked him to get the faiz from Hazrat Shah Khizr Rumi who gave him the title “Ghawsud Dahar”, he made him his Khalifa, after receiving khilafat from him he went to Arab, Ajam, China and India then he finally settled in Malwa region in (Nalchha, Dhar). His shrine or Dargah (mausoleum) is at Nazmuddin Qalandar Dargah in the city of Nalchha, Dhar which is a place of Pilgrimage and visited millions of devotees every year.

Mela / Urs (Annual Fair) 
Nazmuddin Qalandar's annual Urs (death anniversary), held on the 20 and 21 Dhu al-Hijjah – the last month of the Muslim lunar calendar, brings thousands pilgrims from all over India and abroad.

References

Sufi mystics
Sufism in India
Hashemite people
Indian Sufis
Sunni imams
Hanafi fiqh scholars
Indian Sunni Muslim scholars of Islam
Muslim reformers
Indian Sunni Muslims
Indian Sufi saints
13th-century Muslim scholars of Islam
14th-century Muslim scholars of Islam
Sufi teachers
Hanafis
Islamic philosophers
1209 births